Baji Rout (5 October 1926  11 October 1938) was a freedom fighter,  having been killed at the age of twelve. He was born on 5 October 1926. Rout, who was a boat boy, was shot by British police when he refused to ferry them across the Brahmani River on the night of 11 October 1938 at Nilakanthapur Ghat, Bhuban, Dhenkanal district.

Baji Rout was the youngest son of a boatman on the Brahmani river. As an active member of the Banar Sena of Prajamandal (Party of People), he had volunteered to keep watch by the river at night. The British Police force ordered him to cross the river by his boat which he denied. The police force then fired upon Baji Rout along with Laxman Malik, Fagu Sahoo, Hrushi Pradhan and Nata Malik.

He was born on 5 October 1926 as the youngest son of Hari Rout and Rania Devi in the village Nilakanthapur in the then state of Dhenkanal. He lost his father in his childhood. Her mother who was earning a living by grinding and husking paddy at a quern in the neighborhood was unable to spend anything on his education. He had two elder brothers who also earned very little to support the family.

Legacy

Baji Rout Cup
On 3 November 2022, Union Education Minister Dharmendra Pradhan inaugurated a national level football tournament in honour of Baji Rout, which was won by Rajasthan United.

Bibliography
Sachidananda Routray, Jnanpith Award winning poet has written a poem Baji Rout. The poem starts like this:

" ନୁହେଁ ବନ୍ଧୁ, ନୁହେଁ ଏହା ଚିତା ,
ଏ ଦେଶ ତିମିର ତଳେ 
ଏ ଅଲିଭା ମୁକତି ସଳିତା। "

Which in English means:

"It is not a pyre, O Friends! When the country is in dark despair, it is the light of our liberty. It is our freedom-fire."

Films 
 "Baji Rout: India's Youngest Freedom Fighter", a docu drama which portrays  Rout's entire life journey as a freedom fighter and ultimately his encounter with the British. This Hindi short film on Baji Rout titled : "Baji Rout:India's youngest freedom fighter", was made by a group of students, directed by Riyyan Farooq and Diksha Nayak, produced by Candid Cinema. 15 September 2018.

References

1926 births
1938 deaths
People from Dhenkanal district
Indian independence activists from Odisha
Executed revolutionaries
Executed Indian people
Revolutionary movement for Indian independence
Indian revolutionaries
People from Odisha